"The Jolly Boys' Outing" is the eighth Christmas special episode of the BBC sitcom Only Fools and Horses, first screened on 25 December 1989. Despite being aired as a Christmas special, it is set on an August bank holiday weekend, and sees Del and the gang go on a road trip to Margate.

Synopsis
Rodney is now working for Alan Parry, Cassandra's father, at his printing firm Parry Print Ltd, while Uncle Albert has been promoted to "Executive Lookout" (i.e., watching out for the police) for Trotters Independent Traders. The so-called traditional Jolly Boys' Outing, whereby all the regulars at the Nag's Head pub go on an annual coach trip ("beano") to the seaside resort of Margate in Kent is also approaching.

The following evening, at Rodney and Cassandra's flat, the Trotters enjoy a sophisticated dinner with Cassandra's parents as well as her boss, Stephen, and his wife, Joanne. Rodney is unable to hide his contempt of Stephen due to what he sees as his yuppie arrogance, while Del Boy mistakenly thinks, to Stephen's chagrin, that he and Stephen are kindred spirits. Del invites Stephen to join the outing due to Joanne's absence visiting her parents for the weekend, but he politely declines. The night ends with a game of Trivial Pursuit, in which Del suggests that a female swan is called a bic (after Rodney tried to give him a clue by discreetly showing him a pen).

The trip to Margate is chaotic: the coach driver, Harry, seemingly gets drunk halfway through the journey, and Rodney gets arrested for accidentally kicking a football at a policeman. Just as the Jolly Boys are preparing to leave Margate and head home, their coach, equipped with a faulty Albanian radio from a batch recently sold by Del, explodes when the radio ignites the fuel line (the fumes of which had actually caused Harry's incoherence). As there is a train strike and a restricted bank holiday bus service, the Jolly Boys are forced to spend the night in Margate. Aware of the limited number of vacant hotel rooms, the Jolly Boys split up into groups and hunt in different directions.

Del, Rodney and Albert form their own group. After frantic searching for somewhere to stay, they arrive at an inviting and cosy guest house, only to find that the last rooms have been taken by Jevon, Mickey Pearce and Denzil. The landlady, Mrs Baker, directs them to the Villa Bella, a rundown, gloomy hotel managed by the dour Mrs Cresswell. Rather than spend the night there, however, Del and Rodney decide to visit the Mardi Gras nightclub after Del was given complimentary tickets from Mike's old rival, Eddie Chambers, at a halfway house earlier that day. At the Mardi Gras, Del discovers his ex-girlfriend Raquel is working as part of a magic act with the "Great Ramondo". Del and Raquel happily discuss the past, with Del explaining that he had actually been on his way to see her to stop her leaving the UK but was arrested (as seen in "Dates"), and it is clear that they still have affection for each other. Raquel states her intention to leave the act after it ends, as Ramondo, with his volatile temper, intimidates her. Del invites her to live with him in Peckham, which she accepts, and they part with a kiss.

Del and Rodney return to the hotel in the early hours and discover that they have been locked out. After failing to wake up Albert by throwing a stone at the window, breaking it in the process, they head to Raquel's flat to sleep for the night, only to find out that she shares it with Ramondo. Suspecting Ramondo of blackmailing Raquel sexually in return for a job and a home, Del loses his composure, assaults Ramondo and throws his suitcase out of the window. However, Del discovers from a shocked Raquel that Ramondo is actually gay and they only live together as it is cheaper than renting separate flats. A humiliated Del apologises to Raquel and Ramondo, who forgive him and allow him and Rodney to stay.

The next morning, Rodney returns to his flat and finds Cassandra and Stephen apparently alone together. Rodney, suspecting Stephen of seducing Cassandra, flies into a rage and sucker punches Stephen, breaking his nose, but finds that Joanne is also there (she had planned to visit her parents, but could not do so because of the train strike). He is immediately kicked out by Cassandra. Back at Nelson Mandela House, Del speaks with Raquel over the telephone, before he learns the unintended consequences of his actions the previous night; Albert was hit on the head by the stone that Del threw through the hotel window, and Mike and Boycie were both injured by Ramondo's suitcase when he threw it out of Raquel's window. However, Del and Raquel arrange to meet the next week. The episode ends as Del starts eating Albert's breakfast and berates Albert for trying to eat it himself, before Rodney angrily enters the flat with his belongings.

As the credits roll, a recap of the events in Margate is played along to the song "Margate" by Chas & Dave.

Episode cast

Production 
The episode was filmed on location in Margate, Dreamland and Dumpton market, which later became a Wyevale Garden centre. The exterior police station shot is the now closed Broadstairs Police Station. The pit stop at the Roman Galley pub on the way to Margate was on the A299 at the Brook Lane turn off to Reculver, which is now a private residence. Cassandra's flat exterior shot was at Richard Court, Lower Northdown Ave, Cliftonville. The hotel exteriors were filmed at Dalby Square, Cliftonville. The exploding coach scene was at the car parks near the old aquarium in Cliftonville, which is now Bethesda Medical surgery, Palm Bay Ave.

Story arc 
The events of this episode are mentioned in "Sleepless in Peckham", implying that the Jolly Boys' Outing was a regular event from the 1960s before Del blew the coach up. The very first Jolly Boys' Outing was seen in the first episode of the prequel Rock & Chips.
During this episode, Cassandra mentions to Rodney the events of an earlier episode, "The Unlucky Winner Is....".

Episode concept
John Sullivan's sister-in-law Penny was the inspiration behind the script, as she told him of an event her father used to go on each year, called the "Jolly Boys' Outing".

Music
 Gregory Isaacs: "Night Nurse"
 Third World: "Now That We've Found Love"
 Roxy Music: "Over You"
 Tears For Fears: "Everybody Wants To Rule The World"
 Bananarama & Lananeeneenoonoo: "Help!"
 Tom Robinson Band: "2-4-6-8 Motorway"
 Deacon Blue: "This Changing Light"
 Simply Red: "Turn It Up"
 Harry Nilsson: "Everybody's Talkin'"
 Simply Red: "Move On Out"
 Lee Gibson: "Just The Way You Are"
 Alf Bigden, Ronnie Price & Dave Richmond: "I May Be Wrong"
 Alf Bigden, Ronnie Price & Dave Richmond: "Sunshine Of My Life"
 Chas and Dave: "Margate" (played over the end credits)

References

External links

1989 British television episodes
1989 television specials
British television specials
British Christmas television episodes
Television episodes set in Kent
Margate
Only Fools and Horses special episodes
Television episodes about vacationing